Pool A of the 2007 Rugby World Cup began on 8 September and was completed on 30 September. The pool was composed of 2003 World Cup winners England, as well as Samoa, South Africa, Tonga and United States.

Overview

Pool A threw up few surprises, with both South Africa and England qualifying for the quarter-finals, as expected. Third place went to Tonga, who beat the USA and South Pacific neighbours, Samoa, to secure a place in the 2011 Rugby World Cup. Tonga also gave the eventual champions a close run, losing by less than a try. Both South Africa and England went on to reach the final of the tournament, which South Africa won by 15 points to 6.

All times local (UTC+2)

England vs United States

South Africa vs Samoa

United States vs Tonga

England vs South Africa

Notes
Percy Montgomery equalled Joost van der Westhuizen as the most-capped Springbok with his 89th appearance.
This was the first scoreless match for England at the World Cup; it was also the first time a past World Champion had failed to score in a World Cup match. It was only the fifth time a side had failed to score in a World Cup match, after Canada, Spain, Namibia and Romania, although Scotland joined this list later in the tournament.

Samoa vs Tonga

South Africa vs Tonga

Notes
Percy Montgomery earns his 90th cap, surpassing Joost van der Westhuizen as the most-capped Springbok.

England vs Samoa

Samoa vs United States

England vs Tonga

South Africa vs United States

Notes
 Takudzwa Ngwenya's try, which he scored from his own half after faking out Bryan Habana and running past him, was named the Try of the Year in international rugby by the International Rugby Players' Association, an award handed out at the 2007 IRB Awards.
Thretton Palamo became the youngest player ever to appear in the Rugby World Cup, at age 19 years 8 days. The previous record was held by Federico Méndez of Argentina, who appeared in the 1991 Rugby World Cup at 19 years 54 days.

Notes and references

External links
Pool A at rugbyworldcup.com

Pool A
2007–08 in English rugby union
2007 in South African rugby union
2007 in Samoan rugby union
2007 in Tongan rugby union
2007 in American rugby union